Pedro Valdemar Soares Gonçalves (born 7 February 1976) is a Portuguese football manager.

Gonçalves is a head-coach at the 1º de Agosto's youth academy.

In April 2018, he was appointed as the head-coach of the Angolan under-17 national team that he qualified for the 2019 FIFA World Cup.

In August 2019, he was appointed as manager of the Angola national football team on an interim basis.

References

1976 births
Living people
Portuguese football managers
Angola national football team managers
Portuguese expatriate football managers
Portuguese expatriate sportspeople in Angola
Expatriate football managers in Angola